Lost Springs Township is a township in Marion County, Kansas, United States.  As of the 2010 census, the township population was 197, including the city of Lost Springs.

Geography

Cities and towns
The township contains the following settlements:
 City of Lost Springs.

Cemeteries
The township contains the following cemeteries:
 Lost Springs Cemetery, located in Section 23 T17S R4E.
 Lost Springs Station Cemetery (records no longer available, cemetery no longer exists), located in Section 20 T17S R4E.
 Pleasant Hill Cemetery, located in Section 32 T17S R4E.
 St. Pauls Lutheran Church Cemetery, located in Section 6 T17S R4E.

Transportation
U.S. Route 77 highway passes north to south through the township.

References

Further reading

External links
 Marion County website
 City-Data.com
 Marion County maps: Current, Historic, KDOT

Townships in Marion County, Kansas
Townships in Kansas